The 2006 Massachusetts gubernatorial election was held on November 7, 2006. The incumbent Republican governor, Mitt Romney, chose not to seek a second term. Polls had been mixed prior to Romney's announcement, with one poll showing Romney slightly leading Democrat Attorney General Tom Reilly and other polls showing Reilly, who was then the Democratic frontrunner, in the lead.

The election was won by the Democratic former United States Assistant Attorney General Deval Patrick, who became the second African-American governor in the United States since Reconstruction and the first Democratic governor of Massachusetts since Michael Dukakis left office in 1991. This was the last time until 2022 that the Democratic nominee won a majority.

Democratic primary

Governor

Candidates
 Chris Gabrieli, businessman and Lieutenant Governor nominee in 2002
 Deval Patrick, former Assistant United States Attorney General for Civil Rights
 Thomas Reilly, Massachusetts Attorney General

Endorsements
 Deval Patrick: Attleboro Sun Chronicle, Bay State Banner, Blue Mass Group, Boston Globe, Brookline Tab, Cambridge Chronicle, Hamilton-Wenham Chronicle, Wellesley Townsman, Worcester Magazine

 Tom Reilly: Boston Herald, Cape Cod Times, Springfield Republican

Campaign
The Democratic State Caucuses were held in February in all cities and towns to elect delegates to the state convention. The Patrick campaign organized their supporters, many of whom had never been involved in such party processes before, to win twice as many pledged delegates as the Reilly campaign. (Chris Gabrieli did not join the race until a month later, which played a major role in his difficulty in getting on the ballot.)

At the Democratic Convention on June 3 in Worcester, each candidate needed to receive support from 15% of the delegates to be on the primary ballot in September. There was some question as to whether Gabrieli could succeed after entering the race so late. Patrick received the convention's endorsement with 57.98% of the vote, Reilly made it with 26.66%, and Gabrieli narrowly achieved ballot access with 15.36% of the delegates' votes.

The campaign was highlighted by numerous debates. The first two debates took place in late April. WBZ-CBS4 News hosted a debate between Democratic candidates Chris Gabrieli, Deval Patrick, and Tom Reilly on April 21 and it aired at 8:30 AM on April 23. A second Democratic candidate debate, moderated by Sy Becker from WWLP TV 22, was held at Agawam Middle School on April 27. 

The "Campaign to Stop Killer Coke", a group dedicated to holding Coca-Cola accountable for violence in its Colombian bottling plant in the mid-1990s, began to attack Patrick and his candidacy. Patrick had resigned from the company and said he'd done so after his attempts to get them to carry out an independent investigation were ignored and undermined. Five Massachusetts unions filed a complaint against the group with the Office of Campaign and Political Finance, in an effort to require the group to disclose its donors. On August 11, it was reported that Reilly's campaign had been behind the efforts. 

The final two televised debates played a key role in the primary campaign, as they took place during the two weeks between Labor Day and Primary Day when the public and the media hold their greatest focus on the election. The first of the two was carried about by the media consortium (which includes the Boston Globe, NECN, and WBUR, among others) and moderated by former New Hampshire governor Jeanne Shaheen, while the second and final debate was held by WBZ-TV and moderated by their political analyst, Jon Keller.

Polling

Results
On September 19, Patrick won the Democratic primary with 50% of the vote, ahead of Gabrieli (27%) and Reilly (23%).

Lieutenant governor

Candidates
 Deb Goldberg, former chair of the Brookline Board of Selectmen
 Tim Murray, mayor of Worcester
 Andrea Silbert, businesswoman

Withdrew
 Sam Kelley, child psychologist and former legislative aide to Congressman Jim McDermott
 Marie St. Fleur, State Representative from Dorchester

Declined
 Chris Gabrieli (running for Governor)

Campaign
On April 23, 2006, a "virtual debate" between Murray, Silbert, and Sam Kelley was released on SaintKermit.com. 

On May 21, all four candidates debated in Lowell. Four days later, on May 25, Kelley dropped out of the race and joined the Deval Patrick campaign as a volunteer advisor on health care issues.

At the Democratic convention in Worcester on June 3, Worcester Mayor Tim Murray was endorsed by a voice vote after receiving 49% on the first ballot. Andrea Silbert and Deb Goldberg both qualified for the ballot with 29% and 22% respectively.

Endorsements
 Deborah Goldberg: Boston Herald
 Tim Murray: Boston Globe, Worcester Telegram & Gazette
 Andrea Silbert: Blue Mass Group, Brookline Tab

Polling

Results
Tim Murray won the Democratic nomination for lieutenant governor on September 19 with 43% of the vote.

Republican primary

Governor

Candidates
 Kerry Healey, Lieutenant Governor of Massachusetts

Declined
 Christy Mihos, businessman (running as an Independent)

Romney endorsed Lieutenant Governor Kerry Healey to succeed him in the 2006 gubernatorial election. Healey was unopposed for the Republican nomination.

Lieutenant governor

Candidates
 Reed Hillman, former State Representative and Massachusetts State Police Colonel

As incumbent Kerry Healey ran for governor, the position of lieutenant governor was open. Reed Hillman was unopposed for the Republican nomination

General election

Candidates 
 Kerry Healey, Lieutenant Governor of Massachusetts (Republican)
Running mate: Reed Hillman, former State Representative and Massachusetts State Police Colonel
Christy Mihos, businessman and former member of the Massachusetts Turnpike Authority (Independent)
Running mate: John Sullivan, former Winchester selectman

 Deval Patrick, former Assistant United States Attorney General for Civil Rights (Democratic)
 Running mate: Tim Murray, mayor of Worcester

Grace Ross, anti-poverty and LGBT activist (Green-Rainbow)
Running mate: Wendy Van Horne, nurse (withdrew September 1)
Running mate: Martina Robinson, disability rights activist

Campaign 
On April 25, Republican Kerry Healey called for four debates, each involving all four candidates, between the September primaries and November general election, and this proposition was seconded by Patrick.

The general election campaign kicked off on primary day, September 19, after Tom Reilly and Chris Gabrieli conceded and Kerry Healey accepted her uncontested nomination. Deval Patrick followed with his acceptance speech, appearing with his new running mate Tim Murray and former opponent Chris Gabrieli.

The general election campaign was very heated and was referred to by Michael Dukakis as "the dirtiest gubernatorial campaign in my memory". The Healey campaign released attack ads implying that Deval Patrick supports sexual assault or murder of police (culminating in the now infamous "parking lot rape" ad). Healey supporters also protested at the homes of Patrick and Patrick campaign manager John E. Walsh, and documents leaked anonymously to media about Patrick's brother-in-law's criminal history.

After the final debate, WRKO talk radio host John DePetro came under scrutiny for referring to Grace Ross as a "fat lesbian". DePetro was suspended earlier in the year for calling Turnpike Authority chief Matt Amorello a "fag".

Debates
The first televised debate of the general election was held by WFXT and the Boston Herald] on September 25 on WFXT. Moderated by Fox News' Chris Wallace on the day after his Bill Clinton interview.

The second debate was held in Springfield and broadcast on WGBH and NECN.

Endorsements
 Kerry Healey: Boston Herald, Springfield Republican The Eagle-Tribune Sentinel & Enterprise Lowell Sun Cape Cod Times
 Deval Patrick: The Boston Globe, Worcester Telegram & Gazette, MetroWest Daily News, Providence Journal, The Berkshire Eagle, Boston Phoenix, Newton Tab,  West Roxbury & Roslindale Transcript
 Christy Mihos: Walpole Gazette
 Grace Ross: In City Times

Predictions

Polling

Results 

Official results certified by the Massachusetts Secretary of State, as of December 6, 2006, with all 2,166 precincts reporting.

Results by county

Patrick won a majority of the vote in 12 of the 14 counties, and a plurality in 2 (Barnstable and Plymouth).

See also
 2005–2006 Massachusetts legislature
 2006 United States gubernatorial elections
 2006 United States House of Representatives elections
 2006 United States Senate elections

References

External links
 Kerry Healey for Governor & Reed Hillman for Lt. Governor
 Christy Mihos for Governor & John Sullivan for Lt. Governor
 Deval Patrick for Governor & Tim Murray for Lt. Governor
 Grace Ross for Governor & Martina Robinson for Lt. Governor
 Chris Gabrieli for Governor
 Deborah Goldberg for Lieutenant Governor
 Tom Reilly for Governor
 Andrea Silbert for Lieutenant Governor

Governor
2006
Massachusetts